John Smith Lindsay (8 August 1924 – December 1991) was a Scottish footballer who played for Rangers, Everton, Worcester City and Bury.

References

External links
Everton profile

1924 births
1991 deaths
Scottish footballers
Association football fullbacks
English Football League players
Scottish Football League players
Rangers F.C. players
Everton F.C. players
Worcester City F.C. players
Bury F.C. players